The Serbian Heraldry Society, short from Serbian Heraldry, Genealogy, Faleristics and Vexillology Society "White Eagle",  is a learned society devoted to the study and creation of heraldry, specifically Serbian heraldry. The society was established in 1991. 

The society is the only professional organisation of that kind in Serbia. It concerns itself with research and work in the field of the science of arms (heraldry), genealogy, flags (vexillology), medals and honours, along with more specialized fields such as insigniology, archontology and nobilistics.

The society researches:
 Heraldry
 State heraldry
 Territorial heraldry
 Institutional heraldry
 Corporative enterprise heraldry
 Historical family heraldry
 Contemporary family heraldry
 Genealogy

The society has created much of the modern renderings of local and national heraldry in use in Serbia.

See also 

 Serb heraldry

External links 
 Serbian Heraldic Society official website

Serbian heraldry
Heraldic societies
1991 establishments in Serbia
Organizations established in 1991